Kunturini (Aymara kunturi condor,  -ni a suffix to indicate ownership, "the one with a condor", also spelled Condorini) is a mountain in the Peruvian Andes, about   high. Kunturini is located in the Moquegua Region, on the border of the General Sánchez Cerro Province, Chojata District, and the Mariscal Nieto Province, Carumas District, and in the Puno Region, Puno Province, Pichacani District. It lies southwest of the lake Pharaquta.

References

Mountains of Moquegua Region
Mountains of Puno Region
Mountains of Peru